We Are Young is a 2020 Chinese male group reality competition show, which premiered on June 26, 2020 at Youku, and consists of 10 episodes. The show focuses on 84 male trainees which compete to debut in the winning 7-member group, S.K.Y. 

The final 7-member group, which consist of members Lin Mo, Hu Wen Xuan, Zheng Ren Yu, Zuo Ye, Zuo Linjie, Guo Zhen and Li Xi Kan, were debuted on the season finale on 28 August 2020.

Production
The show is the only male group survival show in 2020, as other survival show focuses on female groups this year.

The show was announced on April 23, 2020 with veteran Chinese singers Lay Zhang, Tiger Hu, Cheng Xiao, Ryu Han, and Guo Jingming serving as mentors on each aspects for the program. The cast of 84 males participating this program came from all across the world including China, with some contestants had record in music experience and had a history of participating in a reality competition.

Contestants
There are 84 members participated in this competition, the ranking is determined through a public online voting. Meanwhile, trainees who were unplaced are unable to advance through the first evaluation by mentors. The table denotes the final rank of all trainees:

Episode results

Season summary
The series consist of 10 weeks and 16 episodes overall. The first two weeks are first evaluation whereas 83 contestants (one contestant withdrew before the end of the phase) are put through to a mentoring session, and the mentors have to reduce the total finalists down to 52. However, due to the withdrawal of two contestants, the 50 finalists performed in three showcases and celebrated in a non-competition fifth week over five weeks of non-elimination. On week 7, a public vote eliminated 18 contestants after the third showcase. The semi-finals on Week 9 featured a third batch of elimination for another 18 contestants, leaving 14 contestants to compete in the live grand finals on August 28.

Notes

Jackson Yee joined the first two episodes as the Youth Explorer.
Due to hectic schedule Youth Producer Lay Zhang wasn’t able to join every episode.

References

2020 Chinese television series debuts
Chinese music television series
2020 in Chinese music
2020 Chinese television seasons
Television series impacted by the COVID-19 pandemic